Elmwood Carhouse  is a SEPTA Subway–Surface Trolley Carbarn was constructed in 1981 to house the current Kawasaki LRVs that run on Subway-Surface Routes 11, 13, 34 & 36. Route 10 which also uses Kawasaki LRVs was housed here from September 1992 until September 2005, now with the return of Surface Streetcar Trolley Route 15 back to streetcar operations, Route 10 returned back to Callowhill Carhouse.

The Elmwood Carhouse replaced the vintage Woodland Carhouse which was located at 49th & Woodland. On October 23, 1975 part of their carbarn suffered a devastating fire in which several trolleys were destroyed.

The official date of Elmwood Carhouse opening was November 15, 1981.

Elmwood Carhouse

Elmwood Depot also known as Elmwood Loop and Elmwood Avenue Loop, is a storage facility and alternate terminus for the SEPTA Route 36 Subway-Surface Trolley Line, in the Elmwood Park section of Southwest Philadelphia. Besides cars from Route 36, the facility is used to store and maintain cars from SEPTA Routes 11, 13, and 34. SEPTA Route 10 was also housed here from 1992 to September 5, 2005.

Its official address is at 7311 w Elmwood Avenue, but the yard stretches southwest to Island Road and north to Amtrak's Northeast Corridor line. Trolleys run from here to Eastwick Loop or to Center City Philadelphia. It is also used by railfans during the annual "OcTrolleyfest" sponsored by the Darby Borough Historic Commission.

A decorative arch bridge carries the NEC/Wilmington/Newark Line right-of-way over Island Road and the trolley tracks between Routes 11 and 36. Between the Eastwick Loop and Elmwood Depot, the trolleys have their own right-of-way for a short period in the middle of Island Road where the tracks are not on a paved street and the wooden ties are visible.

Outside the yard, there are connections to SEPTA City Bus Route 68 and SEPTA Suburban Bus Route 108.

References

External links 

Elmwood Depot Track map (Philadelphia Trolley.org)
Elmwood Carhouse (KTransit.com)
 Station from Google Maps Street View

SEPTA Subway–Surface Trolley Line stations
Rail yards in Pennsylvania
Railway stations in Philadelphia